Tom Riley (born 4 May 1985 in Graig, Pontypridd, Wales) is a rugby union player who plays at centre for the Cornish Pirates.

Riley previously played for Pontypridd RFC, Cardiff Blues, Newport RFC and Newport Gwent Dragons, and has played for Wales at U18, U19 and U21 levels. Riley made his debut for Newport Gwent Dragons against Ulster on 6 September 2009. He signed an extended contract with Newport Gwent Dragons in January 2010. He was released by Newport Gwent Dragons at the end of the 2011–12 season and signed for the Cornish Pirates in June 2012.

References

External links
Newport Gwent Dragons profile
Pontypridd RFC profile
Cardiff Blues profile

1985 births
Living people
Welsh rugby union players
Cardiff Rugby players
Newport RFC players
Rugby union players from Pontypridd
Pontypridd RFC players
Dragons RFC players
Cornish Pirates players
Rugby union centres